Rachel Roberts (20 September 192726 November 1980) was a Welsh actress. She is best remembered for her screen performances as the older mistress of the central male characters in both Saturday Night and Sunday Morning (1960) and This Sporting Life (1963). For each, she won the BAFTA Award for Best British Actress. She was also nominated for the Academy Award for Best Actress for This Sporting Life. Her other notable film appearances included Murder on the Orient Express (1974), Picnic at Hanging Rock (1975) and Yanks (1979).

Roberts' theatre credits included the original production of the musical Maggie May in 1964. She was nominated for the 1974 Tony Award for Best Actress in a Play for the plays, Chemin de Fer and The Visit, and won a Drama Desk Award in 1976 for Habeas Corpus.

Early life and career 
Roberts was born in Llanelli, Carmarthenshire, Wales. After a Baptist upbringing (against which she rebelled), followed by study at the University of Wales and the Royal Academy of Dramatic Art, she began working with a repertory company in Swansea in 1950. She made her film debut in the Welsh-set comedy Valley of Song (1953), directed by Gilbert Gunn.

Her portrayal of Brenda in Karel Reisz's Saturday Night and Sunday Morning (1960) won her a British Academy Film Award. Lindsay Anderson cast her as the suffering Mrs Hammond in This Sporting Life (1963), earning her another BAFTA and an Oscar nomination. Both films were significant examples of the British New Wave of film-making.

In theatre, she performed at the Royal Court and played the title role as the life-enhancing prostitute in Lionel Bart's musical Maggie May (1964). In films, she continued to play women with lusty appetites as in Lindsay Anderson's O Lucky Man! (1973), although the haunting Australian-made Picnic at Hanging Rock (1975), directed by Peter Weir, provided her with a different kind of role, as the authoritarian head teacher of a Victorian girls' school.

After relocating to Los Angeles in the early 1970s, she appeared in supporting roles in several American films such as Foul Play (1978). Her final British film was Yanks (1979), directed by John Schlesinger, for which she received a Supporting Actress BAFTA.

In 1976, she won a Drama Desk Award for her performance in Alan Bennett's play Habeas Corpus. In 1979, Roberts co-starred with Jill Bennett in the London Weekend Television production of Alan Bennett's The Old Crowd, directed by Lindsay Anderson and Stephen Frears.

Personal life
Roberts was married twice and had no children. She first married actor Alan Dobie in 1955. They divorced in 1960. The following year, Roberts married actor Rex Harrison in Genoa, Italy. The marriage was tumultuous; Roberts and Harrison both drank excessively and engaged in public fights. Harrison later left Roberts and they divorced in 1971. Later that year, Harrison married British socialite Elizabeth Rees-Williams, Roberts's former best friend.

Roberts was known in the entertainment industry for the eccentric behaviour that stemmed from her alcoholism. She had a habit of imitating a Welsh Corgi when intoxicated and once, at a party thrown by Richard Harris, attacked actor Robert Mitchum on all fours, chewing his trousers and chomping on his bare skin, while he patted her on the head, saying "there, there". At the time of her death, Roberts was intermittently with Darren Ramirez, an attractive Mexican almost 20 years younger. It was a largely platonic relationship. In her final years she became obsessed with reconciling her relationship with Harrison.

Death
Roberts was devastated by her divorce from Rex Harrison, and her alcoholism and depression worsened. She moved to Hollywood in 1975 and tried to forget the relationship. In 1980, Roberts attempted to reconcile with Harrison, but he was married to his sixth and final wife, Mercia Tinker.

On 26 November 1980, Roberts died at her home in Los Angeles at the age of 53. Her death was initially attributed to a heart attack. Her gardener found her body on her kitchen floor, lying amidst shards of glass; she had fallen through a decorative glass divide between two rooms. An autopsy later determined that her death was a result of swallowing lye or another alkali, or another unidentified caustic substance, as well as barbiturates and alcohol, as detailed in her posthumously published journals. The corrosive effect of the alkali was the immediate cause of death. The coroner documented the cause of death as "swallowing a caustic substance" and, later, "acute barbiturate intoxication." Her death was ruled a suicide.

Roberts was cremated at the Chapel of the Pines Crematory in Los Angeles. Her journals became the basis for No Bells on Sunday: The Memoirs of Rachel Roberts (1984).

In 1992, Roberts' ashes, along with those of her friend Jill Bennett, who committed suicide in 1990, were scattered on the River Thames in London by director Lindsay Anderson during a boat trip, with several of the two actresses' professional colleagues and friends aboard; musician Alan Price sang "Is That All There Is?" The event was included as a segment in Anderson's BBC documentary film, also titled Is That All There Is?

Filmography

References

External links 

 
 
 
 Rachel Roberts born in Llanelli Llanelli Community Heritage

1927 births
1980 suicides
20th-century Welsh actresses
Alumni of RADA
Alumni of the University of Wales
Burials at Chapel of the Pines Crematory
Best British Actress BAFTA Award winners
Best Supporting Actress BAFTA Award winners
Drama Desk Award winners
Drug-related suicides in California
Barbiturates-related deaths
Former Baptists
People from Llanelli
Welsh expatriates in the United States
Welsh film actresses
Welsh television actresses
Welsh stage actresses
Alcohol-related deaths in California
1980 deaths
Female suicides